XHLO-FM is a radio station in Chihuahua City, Chihuahua, Mexico. It broadcasts on 100.9 FM and carries the Exa FM format from MVS Radio.

AM history
XELO was originally the call sign of a border-blaster radio station licensed to the Tijuana / Rosarito area of Baja California, Mexico. At different times these same call letters were also assigned to other Mexican stations based in Nogales, Sonora and Piedras Negras, Coahuila.

On October 25, 1976, the XELO call sign returned, this time to Chihuahua, on a new 1 kW daytimer, XELO-AM. By the time the 1990s rolled around, the station had upgraded its power to 5 kW day and .5 kW night. The station moved to FM in 2011.

In 2013, the 1010 AM frequency was shut down.

External links
Border Radio by Fowler, Gene and Crawford, Bill.  Texas Monthly Press, Austin. 1987 
Mass Media Moments in the United Kingdom, the USSR and the USA, by Gilder, Eric. - "Lucian Blaga" University of Sibiu Press, Romania. 2003

References

1976 establishments in Mexico
Radio stations established in 1976
Mass media in Chihuahua City
Radio stations in Chihuahua
Spanish-language radio stations
Contemporary hit radio stations in Mexico